The 1968 Yale vs. Harvard football game was a college football game between the  and the , played on November 23, 1968.  The game ended in a 29–29 tie after Harvard made what is considered a miraculous last-moment comeback, scoring 16 points in the final 42 seconds to tie the game against a highly touted Yale squad.  The significance of the moral victory for Harvard inspired the next day's The Harvard Crimson student newspaper to print the famous headline "Harvard Beats Yale, 29–29".  In 2010, ESPN ranked it No. 9 in its list of the top ten college football ties of all time.

Yale came into the game with a 16-game winning streak and its quarterback, Brian Dowling, had only lost one game when he was in the starting lineup since the sixth grade. Both schools entered the game with perfect 8–0 records.  It was the first time both schools met when undefeated and untied since the 1909 season.

The tie left both teams 8–0–1 for the season.  The famous headline was later used as the title for Harvard Beats Yale 29-29, a 2008 documentary about the game directed by Kevin Rafferty. Actor Tommy Lee Jones, who played on the offensive line for Harvard in the game, was interviewed for the documentary.

This game stands as the final tie in the Harvard–Yale series, as subsequent rule changes have eliminated ties from college football.

See also
 1968 NCAA University Division football season
 Harvard–Yale football rivalry
 Brian Dowling (Yale quarterback)
 Frank Champi (Harvard quarterback)
 Tommy Lee Jones (Harvard tackle)

References

1968 Ivy League football season
vs. Yale 1968
vs. Harvard 1968
November 1968 sports events in the United States
1968 in sports in Massachusetts